Sapgyo-eup is a small city located within Yesan county in South Chungcheong Province, South Korea.

History
Original meaning of "Sapgyo" is "New Town". "Sa" means "New" in ancient Korean. Sapgyo was of Deoksan city in Joseon Dynasty. The 3 town ("Jangchon", "Daedeoksan", and "Daejoji") merged in 1924, and named "Sapgyo" because the seat of a township office was in Sapgyo village.

Geography
Sapgyo is in Yesan, Chungnam province.

Neighbouring municipalities 
Oga
Deaoksan

Organizations

public office 
 Town Hall of Sapgyo
 Chungcheongnam-do Council
 Chungnam Provincial Police Agency
 Yesan Police Office Sapgyo Patrol Division
 Yesan Fire Station Sapgyo 119 Safety Center (Fire House)

Financial institution 
 Sapgyo Post Office
 Sapgyo Community Credit Cooperative
 Sapgyo NongHyup(National Agricultural Cooperative Federation)

School 
 Sapgyo elementary school
 Yongdong elementary school
 Boseong elementary school
 Sapgyo middle school
 Sapgyo high school

Transportation

Railway 
 Sapgyo Station, Janghang Line

Highway 
 Korea National Route 45
 Korea Local Road 619

Local attractions
Deoksan Hot Springs
Tomb of Prince Namyeon−
Monument of Yun Bong-gil
Sudeoksa

Sub-municipalities
Sapgyo-eup is divided into 21 villages (ri).

References

External links
Official website 
 
 
 

Yesan County
Towns and townships in South Chungcheong Province